The 1975–76 FIBA European Cup Winners' Cup was the tenth edition of FIBA's 2nd-tier level European-wide professional club basketball competition, contested between national domestic cup champions, running from 29 October 1975, to 17 March 1976. It was contested by 20 teams, two less than in the previous edition.

Cinzano Milano won its third title in the competition, by defeating the French League club, Tours, in the final held in Turin.

Participants

First round

|}

*Union Récréation Alexandria withdrew before the first leg, and Partizani Tirana received a forfeit (2-0) in both games.

**Al-Wahda withdrew before the first leg, and Slavia VŠ Praha received a forfeit (2-0) in both games.

Second round

|}

Automatically qualified to the Quarter finals group stage
 Rabotnički
 CSKA Septemvriisko zname

Quarterfinals
The quarter finals were played with a round-robin system, in which every Two Game series (TGS) constituted as one game for the record.

Semifinals

|}

Final
March 17, Palasport "Parco Ruffini", Turin

|}

References

External links 
FIBA European Cup Winner's Cup 1975–76 linguasport.com
FIBA European Cup Winner's Cup 1975–76

Cup
FIBA Saporta Cup